Luciano Delbono (born July 29, 1991) is an American soccer player.

Career
On January 22, 2013, Delbono was selected in the third round (46th overall) of the 2013 MLS Supplemental Draft by the Montreal Impact.  However, he did not sign with the club.

After failing to secure a contract with Montreal, Delbono joined NASL side Carolina RailHawks.  He made his professional debut on October 26, 2013 in a 4-0 victory over Atlanta Silverbacks.

References

External links
 
 Wake Forest University bio

1991 births
Living people
American soccer players
Wake Forest Demon Deacons men's soccer players
North Carolina Fusion U23 players
North Carolina FC players
Association football midfielders
Soccer players from North Carolina
Sportspeople from Winston-Salem, North Carolina
CF Montréal draft picks
USL League Two players
North American Soccer League players